Lucien X. Polastron (born 1944) is a French writer and historian, specializing in paper, books, writing, library history, and Chinese and Arab studies. He has written some 12 French-language books, some of which have been translated into other languages, including English. He lives and works in Paris.

Books in English
Books on Fire: The Destruction of Libraries throughout History, Rochester, Inner Traditions, 2007, 
The Great Digitization and the Quest to Know Everything, Rochester, Inner Traditions, 2009,

References

1944 births
20th-century French historians
Living people
French male non-fiction writers
21st-century French historians